Genin may refer to:

 Génin, a French family name
 Genin (name), a Russian Jewish family name (Генин)
 Robert Genin, (Russian: Роберт Генин; 1884–1941), a Russian Jewish artist
 John Nicholas Genin (1819–1878), a hatter in New York City and sometime associate of P. T. Barnum  
 Vladimir Genin (*1958) (Russian: Владимир Михайлович Генин), a Russian-German composer, pianist and piano teacher 
 Genin, a rank of Japanese ninja
 Genin, or aglycone, the portion of a glycoside that excludes the sugar group